The men's freestyle 86 kg is a competition featured at the 2017 Russian National Freestyle Wrestling Championships, and was held in Nazran, Ingushetia, Russia on June 14.

Medalists

Results
Legend
F — Won by fall
R — Retired
WO — Won by walkover (bye)

Finals

Semifinals: Shamil Kudiyamagomedov def. Anzor Urishev 2–1

Top half

Bottom half

Section 1

Section 2

Repechage

References
http://www.wrestdag.ru/media/content/images/2017/074f1db1f30a498f4df662be04302da9.jpg

Men's freestyle 86 kg